The VMI Keydets basketball teams represented the Virginia Military Institute in Lexington, Virginia. The program began in 1908, and played their games out of Cormack Field House, nicknamed “The Pit”. The Keydets were members of the Southern Conference. Their primary rival is The Citadel.

1969–70

|-
|colspan=7 align=center|1970 Southern Conference men's basketball tournament

1970–71

|-
|colspan=7 align=center|1971 Southern Conference men's basketball tournament

1971–72

|-
|colspan=7 align=center|1972 Southern Conference men's basketball tournament

1972–73

|-
|colspan=7 align=center|1973 Southern Conference men's basketball tournament

Note: The February 15 game against Morris Harvey College was forfeited by VMI due to the use of an ineligible player.

1973–74

|-
|colspan=7 align=center|1974 Southern Conference men's basketball tournament

1974–75

|-
|colspan=7 align=center|1975 Southern Conference men's basketball tournament

1975–76

|-
|colspan=7 align=center|1976 Southern Conference men's basketball tournament

|-
|colspan=7 align=center|NCAA tournament

1976–77

|-
|colspan=7 align=center|1977 Southern Conference men's basketball tournament

|-
|colspan=7 align=center|1977 NCAA Men's Division I Basketball Tournament

1977–78

|-
|colspan=7 align=center|1978 Southern Conference men's basketball tournament

1978–79

|-
|colspan=7 align=center|1979 Southern Conference men's basketball tournament

References
 

VMI Keydets basketball seasons